The Shivoham Shiva Temple is a temple situated on Old Airport Road, Bangalore, India, dedicated to the Hindu deity Lord Shiva. Built in 1995, it features a  statue of Shiva. The temple attracts an estimated 500,000 worshippers and visitors each year, including between 100,000 and 150,000 on the occasion of Maha Shivaratri.

History 
Formerly known as the Shiv Mandir, the temple was consecrated by Sri Shankaracharya of Sringeri on 26 February 1995. The idol of Lord Shiva was created by the sculptor Kashinath. The temple was renamed as the Shivoham Shiva Temple in 2016, when the focus of the temple shifted to helping people attain Moksha by understanding the principles in ancient vedic texts.

Features of the temple

The entrance to the temple has a 25-foot (7.6 m) Shiva Linga, the biggest in Bengaluru city.

The statue of Lord Shiva depicts the River Ganges flowing out of his hair. The statue is seated in a meditative posture with his Damaru and Trishula, as mentioned in the Shiva Purana.

Besides the 65-foot statue of Lord Shiva is a 32-foot statue of Lord Ganesha, unveiled on 1 March 2003 by Dada J.P. Vaswani. Worshippers often tie saffron-coloured threads in front of Lord Ganesha, in the hope that the deity will resolve their problems. Several healing stones are placed at the sanctuary facing the idol of Lord Shiva. Devotees touch or embrace these healing stones in the hope of experiencing miracles.

Activities
The Shiva pilgrimages to Amarnath Temple and Barah Jyotirling Yatra, have been recreated at the temple for those who are unable to travel to the distant location with its adverse climate.

The Amarnath Paanch Dhaam Yatra at the temple takes visitors through a man-made cave on a stony, uneven terrain reminiscent of mountainous regions, where the five holy Dhams are located: Haridwar, Rishikesh, Badrinath, Kedarnath  and Amarnath. There is also a replica of the ice linga at Amarnath.

The 12 Jyotirlinga (Somnath, Mallikarjun, Mahakaleswar, Omkareshwar, Kedarnath, Bhimashankar, Vishwanath Temple. Trimbakeshwar, Baidyanath, Nageshwar, Rameshwaram, Grishneshwar) have also been recreated in an artificial cave at the temple.

Maha Shivaratri at the temple
Maha Shivaratri is celebrated as a day of gratitude to Lord Shiva. Maha Shivaratri celebrations at the temple include day and night festivities. Live bhajans and spiritual events, like Shiv Antakshari and Jagraan, are organised. A laser-projected light and sound show is organised every year during the Maha Shivaratri.

Humanitarian work 
The temple supports the homeless by sharing its proceeds with A.i.R Humanitarian Homes, which operate in three locations in Bangalore and cater for up to 600 residents overall.

References

Sources
 Shiv Mandir, Murugeshpalya, Bangalore
 Shiva Temple in Bangalore
 ಸುತ್ತೋಣ ಬನ್ನಿ - Sutthona Banni: Shiv Mandir Old Airport Road- Bangalore

External links
 

Hindu temples in Bangalore
Shiva in art
Sculptures of gods
Shiva temples in Karnataka